Aoibhinn Ní Shúilleabháin (born 25 October 1983) is an Irish academic, broadcaster and musician. She also won the Rose of Tralee contest in 2005.

Life

Early life
Ní Shúilleabháin is a native of Carnacon near Ballyglass, County Mayo.

Academic career
She graduated with a first-class honours degree in Theoretical Physics from University College Dublin in 2005 and her PhD, completed with the School of Education of Trinity College Dublin in 2014, was funded by an Ussher Fellowship. She later worked as a post-primary school teacher of mathematics, physics, applied mathematics and science, and then became a member of the School of Mathematics & Statistics at University College Dublin, researching and lecturing in mathematics and maths education.

Rose of Tralee contest
Ní Shúilleabháin was crowned the 47th Rose of Tralee on 23 August 2005 in a ceremony broadcast by RTÉ Television. Ní Shúilleabháin was considered by bookmakers to be an early favourite to win the Rose of Tralee contest and, as a result of a rules change, was the first Mayo Rose as final contestant in the history of the competition.

Media career
Ní Shúilleabháin has worked as a broadcaster and host since 2006. In 2007 she was a member of The Panel on RTÉ Two and participated in the 2008 season of Celebrity Bainisteoir on RTÉ One, managing a Gaelic football team from Kiltimagh. In 2009 she hosted the weekly Irish music show The Reel Deal on RTÉ. In 2012, she visited Uganda to report on Trócaire's work there.

Since 2012 she has presented RTÉ's flagship science programmes The Science Squad and 10 Things to Know About... with Jonathan McCrea and Kathriona Devereux.

In 2013, she hosted her own RTÉ Radio 1 lifestyle series Aoibhinn and Company as a summer replacement for Miriam O'Callaghan's Sunday show Miriam Meets.

She presented the RTÉ travel show Getaways with Joe Lindsay for two series and presented the Fleadh Cheoil programme with John Creedon. from 2014 to 2018.

Science communicator
Known in Ireland as a science communicator, Ní Shúilleabháin wrote a monthly column for the Science section of The Irish Times in 2016. In 2017, she won an award for her Outstanding Communication of STEM from the national scientific research agency SFI. In 2017, Ní Shúilleabháin was also named as one of the 40 under 40 European Young Leaders and became a member of the executive committee of WITS (Women in Technology & Science) Ireland.

In 2020 she received the Maths Week Ireland award for outstanding work in raising public awareness of mathematics.

Music
In 2007 and 2008, Ní Shúilleabháin toured the United States, Japan, and Europe as the lead singer of Ragús, a traditional Irish music band.

Personal life
Ní Shúilleabháin was in a relationship with broadcaster Ryan Tubridy from 2009 to 2014. She married Carlos Diaz in a private ceremony in 2017. They have one son, born January 2019.

In September 2020, Ní Shúilleabháin spoke about her experience of being harassed over a two-year period from 2015 to 2017 by a professor at UCD.

References

External links

1983 births
Living people
Alumni of University College Dublin
Alumni of Trinity College Dublin
Irish folk singers
Irish-language singers
Irish schoolteachers
Irish mathematicians
Irish women mathematicians
People from County Mayo
Winners of the Rose of Tralee
21st-century Irish women singers